All My Best may refer to:

Music

Albums
All My Best, by Roger Whittaker
All My Best, by Mickey Gilley (1982)
 All My Best (Ricky Nelson album), a studio album re-recording of old hits (1985)
All My Best, by Burl Ives (1995)
All My Best, by Scott Wesley Brown (2004)
All My Best, by Dave Cloud (2004)
 All My Best (Mai Kuraki album), a Japanese compilation album (2009)
All My Best by Onnik Dinkjian 
All My Best by Hagood Hardy (2004)

Songs
"All My Best (Sweet Mary)", song by Christine Ohlman as Fancy, written by Richard Gerstein (1970)